Rives-d'Autise is a commune in the Vendée department in the Pays de la Loire region in western France. It was established on 1 January 2019 by merger of the former communes of Nieul-sur-l'Autise (the seat) and Oulmes.

See also
Communes of the Vendée department

References

Communes of Vendée
States and territories established in 2019